Svoge Municipality is located in western Bulgaria and is a part of Sofia Province. It covers a territory of 868,6 km2 and has a population of around 21,000 people, more than 1/3 of which lives in the town of Svoge itself. The municipality also includes 37 villages. The municipality is one of the largest by area in the country. It neighbours Montana Province, Vratsa Province & Sofia (City of) province.

Demography

Religion 
According to the latest Bulgarian census of 2011, the religious composition, among those who answered the optional question on religious identification, was the following: 

Nearly all inhabitants are Christians.

Populated places

 Bakyovo
 Batulia
 Bov
 Breze
 Brezovdol
 Bukovets
 Dobarchin
 Dobravitsa
 Druzhevo
 Elenov dol
 Gabrovnitsa
 Gara Bov
 Gara Lakatnik
 Goubislav
 Iskrets
 Lakatnik
 Leskovdol
 Lukovo
 Levishte

 Manastirishte
 Milanovo
 Ogoya
 Opletnya
 Osenovlag
 Rebrovo
 Redina
 Svindya
 Svoge
 Thompson
 Tseretsel
 Tserovo
 Vlado Trichkov
 Yablanitsa
 Zanoge
 Zasele
 Zavidovtsi
 Zhelen
 Zimevitsa

References

External links 
 Official web page of Svogue Municipality

Municipalities in Sofia Province